Cathy Reed (born June 5, 1987) is a retired American-born Japanese ice dancer. With her brother Chris Reed, she is a seven-time Japanese national champion (2008–2011, 2013-2015).

Personal life 
Reed was born in Kalamazoo, Michigan. Her mother is Japanese and her father is American. She was a dual citizen of Japan and the United States until she turned 22. Japanese law required those who are dual citizens at birth to relinquish their dual citizenship, so Cathy Reed chose Japanese citizenship at the age of 22 in order to continue to represent Japan in ice dancing. She competed in ice dancing with her younger brother Chris Reed until her retirement in April 2015. Her younger sister Allison Reed is also an ice dancer, who represented Georgia with Otar Japaridze, Israel with Vasili Rogov and currently represents Lithuania with Saulius Ambrulevicius.

Reed and her skating siblings grew up in Warren Township, New Jersey.

Career 
The Reeds are the 2006 U.S. Novice Dance Champions, but chose to represent Japan beginning in the 2006–2007 season. While Novice national champions are usually given a chance to compete on the Junior Grand Prix, Cathy Reed was too old at the time of their win to compete as a junior internationally. The Reeds were offered a chance to compete for Japan and they took it. They advanced immediately to the senior level, skipping Juniors entirely.

After advancing to the senior level, they placed fourth at the Golden Spin of Zagreb and second at the 2007 Japan Championships. At the 2007 Four Continents, they finished ahead of several teams who had been competing as seniors much longer.

At their Grand Prix debut, the 2007 Skate America, they placed 9th. They placed 8th at their second Grand Prix event, the 2007 NHK Trophy. They won the Japanese Championships. They repeated their 7th-place finish at the Four Continents and then placed 16th at the 2008 World Championships. They represented Japan at the 2010 Winter Olympics in Vancouver.

The Reeds were named in the Japanese team to the 2014 Winter Olympics in Sochi.

After the 2014–15 figure skating season, Cathy retired from competitive figure skating.

Reed now works as a figure skating coach and choreographer in Kansai University (Takatsuki, Osaka) with Mie Hamada and Yamato Tamura. Her students include:
 Mariko Kihara
 Rika Kihira
 Yuna Shiraiwa

Programs 
(with Chris Reed)

Competitive highlights

With Chris Reed for Japan

With Chris Reed for the United States

References

External links 

 
 Cathy Reed & Chris Reed Official Blog
 

1987 births
Japanese female ice dancers
Figure skaters at the 2010 Winter Olympics
Figure skaters at the 2014 Winter Olympics
Olympic figure skaters of Japan
Living people
American female ice dancers
American sportspeople of Japanese descent
Japanese people of American descent
People from Warren Township, New Jersey
Former United States citizens
Sportspeople from Kalamazoo, Michigan
Sportspeople from Somerset County, New Jersey
Asian Games medalists in figure skating
Figure skaters at the 2011 Asian Winter Games
Medalists at the 2011 Asian Winter Games
Asian Games silver medalists for Japan
Academic staff of Kansai University
American women academics